Walter Morgan may refer to:

 Sir Walter Morgan, 1st Baronet (1831–1916), British politician
 Walter L. Morgan (1898–1998), American businessman
 Walter Thomas James Morgan (1900–2003), British biochemist
 Walter Morgan (cricketer) (1871–1941), Australian cricketer
 Walter Morgan (golfer) (born 1941), American golfer
 Sir Walter Morgan (judge) (1821–1903), Chief Justice of the Madras High Court from 1871 to 1879
 Walter Morgan (priest) (died 1732), Welsh Anglican priest